The Latvia national under-17 football team or Latvia U-17 represents Latvia in association football at the under-17 youth level, and is controlled by the Latvian Football Federation.

The team is for Latvian players aged 17 or under at the start of a two-year UEFA European Under-17 Championship cycle, so players appearing for the team can actually be up to 19 years of age. It is considered a feeder team of the Latvian under-19 and under-21 teams.

Competition history
Prior to Latvia's independence in 1991, Latvian players were eligible for selection to the Soviet Union U-16 team. Following the dissolution of the Soviet Union, the Latvian Football Federation was admitted to UEFA as a full member in 1992, and the Latvia U-16 team played their first competitive matches in the first phase of the qualifying tournament for the 1994 European U-16 Championship. The team's competitive debut came on 18 September 1993 against Russia U-16 and they finished their first qualifying campaign as 3rd out of 3 teams, behind Russia and Norway.

Although the team has continued to participate in every under-16 and under-17 European Championship qualifying cycle since 1994, the team has never qualified for any of the tournaments.

European Championship

Under-16 format

Under-17 format

Current players
 The following players were called up for the 2023 UEFA European Under-17 Championship qualification matches.
 Match dates: 19–25 October 2022
 Opposition: ,  and 
Caps and goals correct as of: 3 July 2022, after the match against

See also
Latvia national football team
Latvia national under-21 football team
Latvia national under-19 football team

References

External links
Official website of the Latvian Football Federation

European national under-17 association football teams
Under-17